The 1983 Embassy World Indoor Bowls Championship  was held at the Coatbridge indoor bowling club, North Lanarkshire, Scotland, 8–13 February 1983.

Bob Sutherland won the title beating Burnham Gill in the final 21-10. David Bryant defeated Clive White 21–11 in the third place play off.

Draw and results

Men's singles

References

External links
Official website

World Indoor Bowls Championship